Death Arms is a novel by K. W. Jeter published in 1987.

Plot summary
Death Arms is a novel in which a scheme involves assassinating humanity's collective unconscious.

Reception
Dave Langford reviewed Death Arms for White Dwarf #92, and stated that "Stripped of savage imagery, this would be a thin story; Jeter drives it at stomach jolting pace to the hero's final realization that he can save the world despite being horribly dead."

Reviews
Review by Mike Moir (1987) in Vector 139
Review by Dan Chow (1987) in Locus, #320 September 1987
Review by Paul J. McAuley (1989) in Interzone, #30 July-August 1989
Review by Glenn Grant (1990) in The New York Review of Science Fiction, July 1990

References

1987 novels